Glaisher is a lunar impact crater that is located in the region of terrain that forms the southwest border of Mare Crisium. It lies to the southwest of the lava-flooded crater Yerkes, and west-northwest of the Greaves–Lick crater pair. It is surrounded by a ring of satellite craters of various dimensions, the larger companions generally being arranged to the south of Glaisher.

This crater is circular, with a bowl-shaped interior and a small floor at the midpoint. The crater has not been significantly worn by subsequent impacts. A merged, double-crater formation is attached to its southern rim, consisting of Glaisher E at the northwest end and Glaisher G to the southeast.

The crater was named after British meteorologist James Glaisher and its name was approved by the IAU in 1935.

Satellite craters

By convention these features are identified on lunar maps by placing the letter on the side of the crater midpoint that is closest to Glaisher.

References

External links

 LTO-61B2 Glaisher, Lunar Topographic Orthophotomap (LTO) Series

Impact craters on the Moon
Glaisher family